A fuller is a rounded or beveled longitudinal groove or slot along the flat side of a blade (e.g., a sword, knife, or bayonet) that serves to both lighten and stiffen the blade.  It is made using a blacksmithing tool called a fuller, a form of a spring swage, or impressed during forging. When combined with proper distal tapers, heat treatment and blade tempering, a fullered blade can be 20% to 35% lighter than a non-fullered blade, yet also stiffer, thanks to having two reinforcing ridges created by the opposing sides of the fuller. The ridges and groove are comparable to an I-beam's flanges and web; this shape greatly increases the strength and stiffness of a for a given quantity of material, particularly in the cutting direction. This stiffening effect increases dramatically with blade length.

A fuller is often used to widen a blade during smithing or forging. Fullers are sometimes inaccurately called blood grooves or blood gutters.  Channelling blood is not the purpose of a fuller.

Etymology
The term "fuller" is from the Old English fuliere, meaning 'one that fulls [pleats] cloth'. It is derived from the Latin word fullo. The first recorded use of the term in relation to metal working is 1587.  The first recorded use of the term to describe a groove or channel in a blade is 1967.

Tool

As a blacksmithing tool, a fuller is a type of swage, a tool with a cylindrical or beveled face used to imprint grooves into metal. 

Fullers are typically three to six inches long. If a groove is to be applied to both sides of the steel, two fullers may be used at the same time, sandwiching the workpiece in the middle. Often, one fuller will have a peg that holds it securely in the anvil, while the other fuller will have a handle and a flat head, for striking with a hammer. A blade being fullered will generally be slowly pulled through the fullers as it is being hammered, displacing material to the side (rather than removing it) and thereby creating ridges on either side of a groove. These ridges may be hammered flat, widening the blade, or they are often shaped with other swages, increasing the strength of the blade both by creating thicker areas in its cross section and lateral ridges that resist lengthwise deflection.

In addition to being used to "draw out" steel, hammering a short block into a long bar, fullers are also used in the production of items such as hinges and latches, plow parts, and horseshoes.

Japanese blades
In Japanese swordsmithing, fullers have a rich tradition and terminology, enough that there are separate terminologies for the top (hi, usually pronounced as bi when used as the second member of a compound) and bottom (tome) ends of the feature.

Bo-hi: A continuous straight groove of notable width, known as katana-bi on tantō. With soe-bi, a secondary narrow groove follows the inner straight length of the main one. With tsure-bi, the secondary is similar but continues beyond the straight length.
Futasuji-hi: Two parallel grooves.
Shobu-hi: A groove shaped like the leaf of an iris plant.
Naginata-hi: A miniature bo-hi whose top is oriented opposite from the blade's, and usually accompanied by a soe-bi. Seen primarily on naginatas. 
Kuichigai-hi: Two thin grooves that run the top half of the blade; the bottom half is denoted by the outer groove stopping halfway while the inner one expands to fill the width.
Koshi-bi: A short rounded-top groove found near the bottom of a blade, near to the tang.
Tome
Kaki-toshi: The groove runs all the way down to the end of the tang.
Kaki-nagashi: The groove tapers to a pointed end halfway down the tang.
Kaku-dome: The groove stops as a square end within 3 cm of the tang's upper end.
Maru-dome: Similar to the kaku, except with a rounded-end.

The kukri

The Nepali kukri has a terminology of its own, including the "aunlo bal" (finger of strength/force/energy), a relatively deep and narrow fuller near the spine of the blade, which runs (at most) between the handle and the corner of the blade, and the "chirra", which may refer either to shallow fullers in the belly of the blade or a hollow grind of the edge, and of which two or three may be used on each side of the blade.

Gallery

See also
 Fuller (metalworking)
 Swaging

References

Further reading
 
 

Blade weapons
Metalworking tools